Minister without portfolio is a minister in the Government of Serbia with no particular ministry but who has some specific responsibilities.

The office was usually held simultaneously by several people at the same time (in the second cabinet of Mirko Marjanović there were ten Ministers without portfolio at one point).

The current Ministers without portfolio, by date of assuming office, are namely: Novica Tončev (since 28 October 2020), Đorđe Milićević (since 26 October 2022) and Edin Đerlek (since 26 October 2022).

List of ministers
Political Party:

See also
 Government of Serbia

References

External links
 Government of Serbia
 Serbian ministries, etc – Rulers.org
 Cabinet of Minister in charge of Demography and Population Policy 
 Cabinet of Minister in charge of Regional Development and Coordination of Public Enterprises 

Government of Serbia
Ministers without portfolio
Serbia
Ministers without portfolio